Chris Babida is a composer, arranger, conductor, music director and record producer. He has also done numerous film soundtracks. His film work includes Dragon Force which was released in 1982, Happy Sixteen also released in 1982,  Sworn Brothers which was released in 1987, Armour of God II: Operation Condor which was released in 1991, C'est la vie, mon chéri which was released in 1993 and Bishonen which was released in 1998. He has produced albums for Andy Bautista, Sam Sorono and Mona Richardson. At the 15th Hong Kong Film Awards he won an award in the Best Original Film Score category for The Phantom Lover.

Background
Babida is well recognized for his work and an award-winning composer and by 2015 he had composed at least 50 film scores. He has been referred to as the Godfather of pop and cross-over music. He is of Filipino descent.

Film work

1980s
One of the early films he worked on was the Po-Chih Leong directed film You ni mei ni which starred Paul Che, Ching Yee Chong and Lee Chun-Wa. The film was released in 1980.
He provided music for the Michael Mak directed martial arts film Dragon Force which starred Bruce Baron, Frances Fong, Sam Sorono and Bruce Li.

2000s
He provided music for the 2016 film, The Last Race which was directed by Stephen Shin and Michael Parker.

Production

References

External links
 Website
 Imdb: Chris Babida

 Discogs: Chris Babida

Hong Kong record producers
Living people
Year of birth missing (living people)